The 1985 Australian Touring Car season was the 26th season of touring car racing in Australia commencing from 1960 when the first Australian Touring Car Championship and the first Armstrong 500 (the forerunner of the present day Bathurst 1000) were contested. It was the first season in which Australian Touring Car regulations were based on those for the FIA Group A Touring Car category.

Touring Cars competed at 19 race meetings in Australia during the 1985 season, contesting the following events:
 The ten rounds of the 1985 Australian Touring Car Championship (ATCC)
 The five rounds of the 1985 Australian Endurance Championship (AEC)
 The four rounds of the 1985 AMSCAR series, held exclusively at Amaroo Park. One round was also an ATCC round, one was an AEC round.
 A 15 lap touring car support race at the 1985 Australian Grand Prix meeting at the Adelaide Street Circuit

In 21 races contested in 1985 (including the heats of the AMSCAR series rounds), the JPS Team BMW 635 CSi of Jim Richards won 17 races. This saw him easily win the ATCC, Endurance and AMSCAR titles.

Season review

Race calendar

Australian Touring Car Championship

Australian Endurance Championship

Castrol 500

James Hardie 1000

AMSCAR Series

Australian Grand Prix support race 
This race was a 15 lap support event at the 1985 Australian Grand Prix meeting.

References

Linked articles contain additional references.

External links
 Official V8 Supercar site

Australian Touring Car Championship
Touring Cars